The ventral nuclear group is a collection of nuclei on the ventral side of the thalamus. According to MeSH, it consists of the following:
 ventral anterior nucleus
 ventral lateral nucleus
 ventral posterior nucleus – this is made up of two nuclei: the ventral posterolateral nucleus and the ventral posteromedial nucleus

See also
Anterolateral region of the motor thalamus

References

Thalamus